The 62nd Hong Kong Macau Interport was held in Macau on 3 June 2006. The match ended with 0-0 and resulted in shared champions.

Squads

Hong Kong
Hong Kong was represented by its under-23 team.
 Head Coach: Lai Sun Cheung

Macau
The following shows part of the squad only.

Results

References

Hong Kong–Macau Interport
Macau
Hong